Le Baptême may refer to:

 Le Baptême (album), an album by -M-
 Le Baptême (short story), a short story by Guy de Maupassant